The following outline is provided as an overview and topical guide to Somaliland:

Somaliland – is an internationally unrecognised country. The government of Somaliland regards the territory as the successor state to the British Somaliland protectorate, which was independent for a few days in 1960 as the State of Somaliland, before voluntarily uniting with the Trust Territory of Somalia (the former Italian Somaliland) later the same week to form the Somali Republic.

General reference 

 Common English country name: Somaliland
 Official English country name:  The Republic of Somaliland
 Common endonym(s):  
 
 
 Common endonym(s):  
 Official endonym(s):  
 Adjectival(s): Somali
 Demonym(s): Somalilander;
 ISO country codes:  **
 ISO region codes:  **
 Internet country code top-level domain:  None

Geography of Somaliland 

 Somaliland is: a country
 Location:
 Eastern Hemisphere, on the Equator
 Africa
 East Africa
 Horn of Africa
 Time zone:  East Africa Time (UTC+03)
 Extreme points of Somaliland
 High:  Shimbiris 
 Low:   Guban 
 Land boundaries: 
 60 km
 766 km
 402 km
 Coastline:  850,800 km
 Population of Somaliland: 3.5 million
 Area of Somaliland: 176,120  km2
 Atlas of Somaliland

Environment of Somaliland 

 Climate of Somaliland
 Environmental issues in Somaliland
 Ecoregions in Somaliland
 Protected areas of Somaliland
 National parks of Somaliland
 Wildlife of Somaliland
 Flora of Somaliland
 Fauna of Somaliland
 Birds of Somaliland

Natural geographic features of Somaliland 

 Glaciers in Somaliland: none
 Rivers of Somaliland

Ecoregions of Somaliland 

List of ecoregions in Somaliland

Location of Somaliland 
 Republic of Somaliland is situated within the following regions:
 Eastern Hemisphere and Southern Hemisphere
 Africa
 Horn of Africa
 Republic of Somaliland is regarded internationally as a fully autonomous country claimed by Somalia, although it meets all criteria of Montevideo Convention.
 Time zone:  East Africa Time (UTC+03)

Administrative divisions of Somaliland 
Administrative divisions of Somaliland
 Regions of Somaliland
 Districts of Somaliland
 Cities in Somaliland

Regions of Somaliland 

Regions of Somaliland
Awdal
Maroodi Jeeh
Sahil
Sool
Togdheer
Sanaag

Administrative districts of Somaliland  

The regions are divided into eighteen administrative districts.
Sheikh
Berbera
Baki
Borama
Zeila
Lughaya 
Aynabo
Las Anod
Taleh
Hudun
Odweyne
Buhoodle
Gabiley
Hargeisa
Burao
El Afweyn
Erigavo
Lasqoray

Cities in Somaliland  
The main cities and towns in Somaliland:

 Hargeisa (Hargeysa), capital
 Boorama (Borama)
 Berbera
 Burco (Burao)
 Ceerigaabo (Erigabo)
 Dilla
 Las Anod (Laascaanood)
 Gabiley  (Gabileh)
 Baligubadle
 Zeila (Saylac)
 Odweyne
 Yubbe
 Badhan
 Lasqoray

Demography of Somaliland 

Demographics of Somaliland

Presidents of the Somaliland

Abdirahman Ahmed Ali Tuur: 1991–1993
Muhammad Haji Ibrahim Egal: 1993–2002
Dahir Riyale Kahin: 2002–2010
Ahmed Mohamed Mohamoud: 2010–2017
Muse Bihi Abdi: 2017–

Government and politics of Somaliland 

Politics of Somaliland
 Form of government:
 Capital of Somaliland: Hargeisa
 Elections in Somaliland
 Political parties in Somaliland

Branches of the government of Somaliland 

Government of Somaliland

Executive branch of the government of Somaliland 
Head of state and head of government, 5th President of Somaliland,   Muse Bihi Abdi
6th Vice President of Somaliland,   Abdirahman Saylici
 Cabinet of Somaliland

Legislative branch of the government of Somaliland 

 Parliament of Somaliland (bicameral)

Judicial branch of the government of Somaliland 

Judiciary of Somaliland

Foreign relations of Somaliland 

Foreign relations of Somaliland
 Diplomatic missions in Somaliland
 Diplomatic missions of Somaliland

International organization membership 
 None

Law and order in Somaliland 

Judiciary of Somaliland
 Alcohol in Somaliland
 Cannabis in Somaliland
 Capital punishment in Somaliland
 Constitution of Somaliland
 Crime in Somaliland
 Kidnapping and hostage taking in Somaliland
 Human rights in Somaliland
 LGBT rights in Somaliland
 Law enforcement in Somaliland
 Marriage in Somaliland
 Polygamy in Somaliland
 Xeer

Military of Somaliland 

Military of Somaliland
 Command
 Commander-in-chief: Nuh Ismail Tani
 Ministry of Defence of Somaliland
 Forces
 Army of Somaliland
 Navy of Somaliland
 National Intelligence Agency (Somaliland)

Local government in Somaliland 

Local government in Somaliland

History of Somaliland 

History of Somaliland
 State of Somaliland
 Somaliland Declaration of Independence2001 Somaliland constitutional referendum
 2001 Somaliland constitutional referendum
 Current events of Somaliland
 Puntland–Somaliland dispute

Culture of Somaliland 

Culture of Somaliland
 Architecture of Somaliland
 Cuisine of Somaliland
 Languages of Somaliland
 Media in Somaliland
 National symbols of Somaliland
 Coat of arms of Somaliland
 Flag of Somaliland
 National anthem of Somaliland
 Public holidays in Somaliland
 Religion in Somaliland
 Islam in Somaliland
 Christianity in Somaliland
 Roman Catholicism in Somaliland

Art in Somaliland 
 Somali art
 Cinema of Somaliland
 Somaliwood
 Literature of Somaliland
 Music of Somaliland

Sports in Somaliland 

Sports in Somaliland
 Somaliland national football team
 Somaliland League
 Somaliland Cup
 Somaliland Football
 Somaliland national basketball team

Economy and infrastructure of Somaliland 

Economy of Somaliland
 Agriculture in Somalia
 Banking in Somaliland
 Bank of Somaliland
 Communications in Somaliland
 Internet in Somaliland
 Companies of Somaliland
Currency of Somaliland: Shilling
ISO 4217: None
 Economic history of Somaliland
 Energy in Somaliland
 Health care in Somaliland
 Mining in Somaliland
 Somaliland Stock Exchange
 Tourism in Somaliland
 Telecommunications in Somaliland
 Transport in Somaliland
 Airports in Somaliland

Education in Somaliland 

Education in Somaliland
 National Library of Somaliland
 Universities in Somaliland

See also 

Somaliland
Index of Somaliland-related articles
List of international rankings
List of Somaliland-related topics
Outline of Africa
Outline of geography

References

External links 

 Somaliland official website
 Democracy Comes of Age in Somaliland Contemporary Review, 2005, Stefan Simanowitz
 Somaliland BBC Country Profile
 Somaliland - Interest free but not yet Shari’ah-compliant economy
 United Kingdom parliamentary debate on recognition of Somaliland, February 4, 2004 led by Tony Worthington
 Somaliland recognition finds enhanced support

 1
 
Somaliland